Bertil Kjellberg (born 1953) is a Swedish politician of the Moderate Party. He has been a member of the Riksdag since 2002.

External links 
Riksdagen: Bertil Kjellberg (m)

Members of the Riksdag from the Moderate Party
Living people
1953 births
Place of birth missing (living people)
Members of the Riksdag 2002–2006